HMS Cassandra was a  light cruiser of the Royal Navy.  She was part of the Caledon group of the C class of cruisers. Cassandra had a short career, being commissioned in June 1917 and sunk by a mine during the British intervention in the Russian Civil War on 5 December 1918.

She was built by Vickers Limited, Barrow in Furness and laid down in March 1916, launched on 25 November 1916 and commissioned into the Navy in June 1917.

Design and construction
The Caledon sub-class was a slightly larger and improved version of the preceding Centaur sub-class with a more powerful armament. She carried  tons of fuel oil. The ship had a crew of about 400 officers and ratings; this increased to 437 when serving as a flagship.

The main armament of the Caledon-class ships consisted of five BL 6-inch (152 mm) Mk XII guns that were mounted on the centreline. One gun was forward of the bridge, two were fore and aft of the two funnels and the last two were in the stern, with one gun superfiring over the rearmost gun. The two QF  20 cwt anti-aircraft guns were positioned abreast of the fore funnel. The torpedo armament of the Caledons was eight  torpedo tubes in four twin mounts, two on each broadside. Cassandra was fitted with a flying-off deck and hangar for a fighter aircraft to counter German Zeppelins after August 1917.

Cassandra was laid down at the Barrow-in-Furness shipyard of Vickers in March 1916, was launched on 25 November that year and was completed in June 1917.

Service
Cassandra initially joined the 6th Light Cruiser Squadron of the Grand Fleet.  She suffered a mishap when she and sister ship  ran aground on Fair Isle on 15 August 1917 but both ships were successfully salvaged. In October 1917, Cassandra formed part of a large-scale operation, involving 30 cruisers and 54 destroyers, deployed in eight groups across the North Sea in an attempt to stop a suspected sortie by German naval forces in the North Sea. The 6th Light Cruiser Squadron, including Cassandra, was tasked with patrolling off the Horns Reef. Despite these countermeasures, the two German light cruisers  and  managed to evade the patrols, which were deployed expecting German action further to the south, and attacked the regular convoy between Norway and Britain, sinking nine merchant ships and two destroyers,  and  before returning safely to Germany.

Following the end of the First World War, the 6th Light Cruiser Squadron, including Cassandra, formed part of a force sent to the Baltic under the command of Rear-Admiral Edwyn Alexander-Sinclair to support the independence of the newly founded Baltic States against the Bolsheviks. On 5 December 1918 Alexander-Sinclair's force was on passage to Tallinn, threatened by a Bolshevik army, when Cassandra struck a mine, part of an uncharted German minefield, near Saaremaa in the Gulf of Finland. (Ten were killed by the initial explosion while one man fell overboard during the rescue attempt).

Rediscovery

Notes

References

External links
 Ships of the Caledon class

 

Allied intervention in the Russian Civil War
C-class cruisers
Ships built in Barrow-in-Furness
1916 ships
World War I cruisers of the United Kingdom
Maritime incidents in 1918
Shipwrecks in the Gulf of Finland
Ships sunk by mines